Clarksville is an unincorporated community in Wayne Township, Hamilton County, Indiana. It was likely named in honor of George Rogers Clark, an officer in the American Revolutionary War.

History
Clarksville was originally called Nicholsonville, and under the latter name was laid out in 1849 by Abraham Nicholson. Clarksville was incorporated as a town in 1867, however its incorporation was later dissolved.

A post office was established as Nicholsonville in 1850, was renamed Clarksville that same year, and closed in 1902.

Geography

References

Unincorporated communities in Hamilton County, Indiana
Unincorporated communities in Indiana